These are the results of the Women's singles competition in badminton at the 2013 Southeast Asian Games in Myanmar.

Medal winners

Draw

References 
Results

Badminton at the 2013 Southeast Asian Games
South